Lake Barkley, a  reservoir in Livingston County, Lyon County and Trigg County in Kentucky and extending into Stewart County and Houston County in Tennessee, was impounded by the U.S. Army Corps of Engineers in 1966 upon the completion of Barkley Dam. Both the lake and the dam are named for Vice President Alben Barkley, a Kentucky native.

One mile (1.6 km) above the dam is a canal connecting Lake Barkley with Kentucky Lake, forming one of the greatest freshwater recreational complexes in the country.

The lake's level is maintained at different levels throughout the year for flood control purposes. The water level begins dropping gradually on July 1, and winter pool (354 ft/107 m) is reached by December 1. The spring rise starts April 1. The lake's water surface area varies accordingly from 57,920 acres (234 km²) at summer pool to 45,210 acres (183 km²) at winter pool.

History

As with the formation of Kentucky Lake, communities were flooded in the 1960s to build Lake Barkley.  Locals often refer to "Old Eddyville" for Eddyville and "Old Kuttawa" for Kuttawa. The "Old" areas were the portions of the cities that were left above the water after the areas were flooded; these old areas are now lakefront. The present-day cities were created on nearby sites after the lake was impounded.  Old foundations and streets, previously flooded, are still visible during winter pool. Highways were even relocated, including US 68 and US 62, along with state routes and smaller streets. The Illinois Central Railroad was also relocated; the former alignment can still be seen under water from low flying planes above.

The area was significantly damaged by a violent EF4 tornado on December 10, 2021. The State Park lodges were opened to house area residents whose homes were destroyed.

Recreation
Lake Barkley State Resort Park is located on the eastern shore of the lake.

The largest yellow bass ever taken in Kentucky (1 lb., 1 oz.) was caught in the waters of Lake Barkley.

In 2019 officials started to aggressively deal with the invasion of Asian carp into Lake Barkley and Kentucky Lake. The state is using electo-shock fishing and sonic devices and hope to remove 5 million pounds of the species a year

See also
Lake Barkley State Resort Park
Land Between The Lakes National Recreation Area

References

External links

LakeBarkley.org Official web site of Lake Barkley
Lake Barkley – U.S. Army Corps of Engineers
KentuckyLake.com Lake Barkley, Kentucky Lake & Land Between the Lakes Information
 Facilities map of Lake Barkley (Kentucky side)

1966 establishments in Kentucky
Reservoirs in Kentucky
Reservoirs in Tennessee
Protected areas of Houston County, Tennessee
Protected areas of Stewart County, Tennessee
Protected areas of Livingston County, Kentucky
Protected areas of Lyon County, Kentucky
Protected areas of Trigg County, Kentucky
Bodies of water of Houston County, Tennessee
Bodies of water of Stewart County, Tennessee
Bodies of water of Livingston County, Kentucky
Bodies of water of Lyon County, Kentucky
Bodies of water of Trigg County, Kentucky
Cumberland River